Aberdovey railway station serves the seaside resort of  in , Wales.

History
 
The first station opened 24 October 1863 near the harbour on a short branch line south of the present station. It closed when the present station was opened in 1867 by the Aberystwith  and Welsh Coast Railway, then run by the Cambrian Railways. It later became part of the Great Western Railway and then passed on to the London Midland Region of British Railways on nationalisation in 1948. When Sectorisation was introduced, the station was served by Regional Railways until the Privatisation of British Railways.

The original station building is in use as a private residence.

The station was host to a GWR camp coach in 1939. At least one camping coach was positioned here by the Western Region from 1952 to 1962, there were two from 1957 to 1958 and three from 1959 to 1962 when the London Midland Region took over responsibility for the coaches, they had three here from 1963 to 1971.

Facilities

Originally a two-platform station with a short branch line (only a few hundred yards long) to the harbour, the station is now a single-platform, unstaffed halt. Like many stations in Wales and the North of England, the station was constructed before standard platform heights were established and is very low. Aberdovey was the third UK railway station to receive a specially designed raised section - a Harrington Hump - to improve accessibility for passengers. This was funded by the Welsh Government. There are no ticketing facilities at the station, and there is also no waiting room. There is a free car park with 25 spaces.

Services
Transport for Wales run a two-hourly service each way on the Cambrian Coast Line from  - where the route connects to the main Cambrian Line - to  through .  Most services in the May 2016 timetable run to/from Birmingham International via Shrewsbury.

References

External links

Railway stations in Gwynedd
DfT Category F2 stations
Former Cambrian Railway stations
Railway stations in Great Britain opened in 1867
Railway stations served by Transport for Wales Rail
Aberdyfi